Katherine "Katy" Lederer is an American poet and author of the memoir Poker Face: A Girlhood Among Gamblers.

Early life and education
Lederer is the daughter of bestselling non-fiction author Richard Lederer and Rhoda (née Spangenberg) Lederer. Her father is Jewish, while her mother was a gentile., and therefore she was not raised Jewish.
Her siblings are world-class poker players Howard Lederer and Annie Duke.  She graduated from St. Paul's School in Concord, New Hampshire, where her father was on the English faculty.

Lederer later attended the University of California at Berkeley, from which she received her BA in English and anthropology. After graduating in 1995, Lederer moved to Las Vegas to study poker with her siblings, and was subsequently accepted to the Iowa Writers' Workshop on an Iowa Arts Fellowship. While at Iowa, Lederer founded the zine Explosive, which was published in a limited edition of 300 with hand-printed covers by the artist and writer David Larsen. The tenth and final issue of Explosive was published in 2006.

Career
After completing her studies at Iowa in 1998, Lederer moved to New York City, where she worked for psychoanalyst Arnold Cooper. After this, she worked as a coordinator of the Barnard New Women Poets program. From 1998-1999, she was the editor of the Poetry Project Newsletter out of the Poetry Project at St. Mark’s Church in the Bowery. Lederer continues to publish limited-edition books and chapbooks under the Spectacular Books imprint, and also serves as a Poetry Editor of Fence magazine. In 1999, she signed a contract with Crown Books to write a memoir about her family’s life in gambling, Poker Face: A Girlhood Among Gamblers.

Lederer made her poetry debut in 2002 with the collection Winter Sex. Poet D. A. Powell described the poems in the collection “as leaps of faith, fibrillating in the dark world with a kinetic energy that rises out of erotic desire.”  Her memoir, Poker Face: A Girlhood Among Gamblers was published in 2003. It was chosen as a Barnes & Noble Discover Great New Writers selection, and was named a Best Nonfiction Book of the Year by Publishers Weekly and one of eight Best Books of the Year by Esquire Magazine.

From 2002 to 2008, Lederer worked at a quantitative hedge fund in midtown Manhattan, which provided much of the inspiration for the pieces in her most recent poetry collection, The Heaven-Sent Leaf. The title of both the book and the opening poem is taken from the second half of Goethe’s Faust and describes paper money. Other poems in the collection reference the works of John Kenneth Galbraith,  Nietzsche, and Edith Wharton.

Bibliography 
 The Heaven-Sent Leaf (2008). 
 Poker Face: A Girlhood Among Gamblers (2003). 
 Winter Sex (2002).

References

External links
Official website
Profile in The New Yorker's Talk of the Town
Interview with Matt Borondy in "Identity Theory"
Interview with Kurt Andersen on NPR's "Studio 360"
Interview with Anne Strainchamps on NPR's "To the Best of Our Knowledge"
Interview with Tess Vigeland on NPR's "Marketplace"
Interview with Canadian Public Broadcasting's "As It Happens"
Katy Lederer's Author Page at Wave Books

Living people
Year of birth missing (living people)
American people of German-Jewish descent
American memoirists
University of California, Berkeley alumni
Iowa Writers' Workshop alumni
Place of birth missing (living people)
American women poets
American people of Polish-Jewish descent
Writers from New Hampshire
People from Concord, New Hampshire
American women memoirists
21st-century American women